Ali El-Abdi (born 20 December 1993) is a Tunisian professional footballer who plays as a left-back for French club Caen.

Club career
Abdi made his professional debut with Kairouan in a 0–0 Tunisian Ligue Professionnelle 1 tie with EGS Gafsa on 25 December 2011. On 24 June 2019, Abdi moved to Paris FC in the French Ligue 2.

On 21 July 2021, he signed a two-year contract with Caen.

International career
Abdi made his debut for the Tunisia national team on 25 March 2021 in an AFCON 2021 qualifier against Libya.

Career statistics
Scores and results list Tunisia's goal tally first, score column indicates score after each Abdi goal.

Honours
Individual
UNFP Ligue 2 Team of the Year: 2021–22

References

External links
 
 Paris FC Profile

1993 births
Living people
People from Sfax
Tunisian footballers
Association football fullbacks
Tunisia international footballers
Tunisia under-23 international footballers
2021 Africa Cup of Nations players
Ligue 2 players
Tunisian Ligue Professionnelle 1 players
Paris FC players
Club Africain players
Stade Tunisien players
Espérance Sportive de Tunis players
JS Kairouan players
Stade Malherbe Caen players
Tunisian expatriate footballers
Tunisian expatriate sportspeople in France
Expatriate footballers in France
2022 FIFA World Cup players